The Georgia Fruitcake Company is a confectionery company based in Claxton, Georgia.

History
The Georgia Fruitcake Company was founded by Ira S. Womble, Sr. of Claxton. Womble began his career in the bakery business as an apprentice to Savino Gillio-Tos, the founder and owner of The Claxton Bakery, where he worked alongside Albert Parker, the future owner of the bakery and the person who would take The Claxton Bakery worldwide. After completing his apprenticeship, Womble moved to Clearwater, Florida during the Great Depression to run a federal bakery. It was there that he met automobile magnate Henry Ford. Ford eventually set Womble up with a bakery in Richmond Hill, Georgia to work on creating soy-based products. In 1948 Womble moved back to Claxton and opened The Georgia Fruitcake Company.

Sales
The company produces over 5 million pounds of fruitcake annually.

Further reading
 
 The Georgia Fruitcake Company article at American Profile
 The Georgia Fruitcake Company case study at PST Technology Development and Training

References

External links
 Official web site

Evans County, Georgia
Confectionery companies of the United States
Privately held companies based in Georgia (U.S. state)